Clear Channel Broadcasting Tower Redfield is a tall guyed mast located in Grant County (near Redfield), Arkansas, at , currently owned by Mission Broadcasting. It was completed in 1985 and is  1,898.9 feet (578.8 m) high.

Its current FCC registration says it was built in 2001, but that is clearly in error; the tower has been in place ever since KASN, the TV station for which it was originally constructed, went on the air in 1986.  The 1985 date given above is from an old application filed with the FCC on the date the FCC now says the tower was built (August 22, 2001).  Clear Channel Communications acquired the tower when it acquired KASN (KASN and the rest of Clear Channel's television holdings were divested to Newport Television; KASN is now owned by Mission Broadcasting and managed by Nexstar Media Group).  The other former television tower near Redfield, the collapsed KATV tower, also had an incorrect construction date on its FCC registration; but its date was off by only two years, not 16.

In addition to the digital and former analog transmitters of KASN and the transmitter of FM radio station KHKN (owned by iHeartMedia, successor to Clear Channel's radio holdings), it also hosts the digital transmitter of KETS, the flagship station of Arkansas PBS; its analog transmitter was located on the KATV tower until it collapsed. KETS announced on March 5, 2008 that its analog signal would be restored from this tower later that month, continuing until its analog shutdown in 2009.

See also
 List of masts

External links
 
Information at towers.clearchannel.com
AETN (now Arkansas PBS) press release on KETS analog restoration

Buildings and structures in Grant County, Arkansas
Towers in Arkansas